Angelee Claudett Francisco delos Reyes (born October 14, 1987) is a Filipino beauty pageant titleholder and Miss Philippines Earth 2013. Prior to her win at Miss Philippines Earth 2013, she was a contender in several national beauty pageants including Miss Philippines Earth 2009, Miss Bikini Philippines 2011, and Binibining Pilipinas 2012. She is Miss Earth 2013 Top 8 Finalist.

Biography
Angelee has a string of pageant accolades to her name including Miss Columban College 2004, Miss Private School Athletic Association 2005 (2nd Runner-up), Bb. Zambales 2007, Mutya ng Pilipinas 2007 top 15 finalist, Bb. Olongapo 2008, Miss Real Estate Philippines Best in Swimsuit, Hiyas ng Subic (non-semifinalist), Miss Philippines-Earth Miss Talent 2009 and Slimmer's World Miss Bikini Philippines 2011.

On her third attempt in four years, Angelee has finally made it as a Bb. Pilipinas candidate and she feels "blessed and rewarded after all the high heels and hard work!" She believes that "perseverance and determination spell out the difference between failure and success," and along with her brown good looks, enviable figure and unconditional faith in God, she will succeed.

Pageantry

Mutya ng Pilipinas 2007
She joined in Mutya ng Pilipinas 2007 where she landed as one of the Top 15 semifinalists.

Miss Bikini International 2011
She joined Miss Bikini Philippines 2011 and won. She represented the Philippines at the Miss Bikini International 2011 in China where she was one of the Top 12 semifinalists.

Miss Philippines Earth 2013
At her second try for Miss Philippines Earth she finally clinched a "Miss Philippines" title where she was crowned as Miss Philippines Earth 2013 by outgoing Miss Philippines Earth 2012 and Miss Earth-Air 2012, with the help of her friends, Stephany Stefanowitz and Allyka Ardonia. During the pageant she was also awarded as Best in Swimsuit, Beauty for a Cause Award, a gold medal for M.P.E Cooking Contest (Group 1), a gold medal for Darlings of the Press, a silver medal for M.P.E. Talent Competition, and a gold medal for M.P.E. Catwalk Challenge.

Miss Earth 2013
Angelee got to the Top 8 Finalists.  Ms. Venezuela is the new Ms. Earth 2013, Ms. Air is Austria, Ms. Water is Thailand and Ms. Fire is Korea.

References

External links
Official Miss Philippines Earth website

1987 births
Binibining Pilipinas contestants
Miss Philippines Earth winners
Mutya ng Pilipinas contestants
People from Olongapo
Star Magic
Living people
Miss Earth 2013 contestants